Uncle Zebulon's Will is a 1995 work of interactive fiction by Magnus Olsson, in which the player-character plays the nephew of a crackpot scientist, exploring his home and solving magic-based puzzles. It won the TADS category at the inaugural 1995 Interactive Fiction Competition. The game was included on Activision's 1996 commercial release of Classic Text Adventure Masterpieces of Infocom.

References
Game entry at Baf's guide
Game entry at IFWiki

1990s interactive fiction